Hanford Municipal Airport , formerly O18, is a mile (1.6 km) southeast of Hanford, in Kings County, California.

Most U.S. airports use the same three-letter location identifier for the FAA and IATA, but Hanford Municipal Airport is HJO to the FAA and has no IATA code.

Facilities

In the year ending March 29, 2007 the airport had 28,500 aircraft operations, average 78 per day, all general aviation. 75 aircraft are based at this airport: 85% single engine and 15% multi-engine.

Other facilities
National Oceanic and Atmospheric Administration's National Weather Service San Joaquin Valley Weather Forecast office has been at the airport since 1995. The doppler weather radar, part of NEXRAD, serves the southern Central Valley of California counties from Merced to the north, to Kern to the south.

References

External links

Airports in Kings County, California
San Joaquin Valley
Buildings and structures in Kings County, California